"Brillo" is a song by Colombian reggaeton singer J Balvin in collaboration with Spanish new flamenco singer Rosalía. Released on May 25, 2018 through Sony Music Latin, It is the seventh track on Balvin's fifth studio album Vibras (2018). It is written by Alejandro Ramírez, Jesús María Nieves, Marco Masis and both performers.

Critical reception 
Rolling Stone named "Brillo" an "abstract flamenco duet" while The Guardian had to say that "it is an undeniably sensual track where the delicate and versatile vocals of Spanish flamenco singer Rosalía shine over a minimal background". Remezcla's Sara Skolnick stated "Brillo is a hypnotizing track anchored by Barcelona-based vocalist Rosalía, whose mission to“revolutionize flamenco” is articulated once again through intuitive hand claps and vocal takes that lend an airy precision in conversation with Balvin's". It was called a "potential summer hit" by Vogue Magazine.

Commercial performance 
After being posted on YouTube for 72 hours, the song was streamed over 170,000 times, becoming a moderate hit for Balvin. However, the track gained special recognition in Spain after Rosalía became massively successful in the country following the release of her track "Malamente" in May 2018, the lead single of her Latin Grammy Award-winning album El Mal Querer. The track had over 60 million streams in 2020; as of December 2022, Brillo has over 126 million streams on Spotify. The song became a top-20 hit in Spain and was certified platinum there for selling over 40,000 copies.

Live performances 
Balvin has sung the track live on his 2018 Vibras Tour and Rosalía on her El Mal Querer Tour in 2019. They have sung the track together at The Forum in Inglewood in September 2018 as well as during the Primavera Sound music festival in Barcelona in June 2019, which they both headlined.

Personnel 
Credits adapted from Tidal.

 Alejandro Ramirez (Sky Rompiendo el Bajo) - producer, composer and lyricist
 Marco Masis (Tainy) - producer, composer and lyricist
 Jesús Mª Nieves - composer and lyricist
 Jose Álvaro Osorio (J Balvin) - composer and lyricist
 Rosalia Vila Tobella - composer and lyricist

Charts

Certifications

References 

2018 songs
Songs written by Tainy
Songs written by J Balvin
J Balvin songs
Rosalía songs